Yuraqqucha (Quechua yuraq white, qucha lake, "white lake", also spelled Yuraccocha) is a lake in the Cordillera Blanca in the Andes of Peru. Pukaqucha is located in the Ancash Region, Huaylas Province, Santa Cruz District, northwest of the peak of Pukarahu (Quechua for "red mountain").

References 

Lakes of Peru
Lakes of Ancash Region